Peter Baumgartner  is a German professional ice hockey defenceman who is currently playing for the Hannover Scorpions in the Deutsche Eishockey Liga (DEL).

External links

Hannover Scorpions players
Living people
1991 births
German ice hockey defencemen